Nullarbor Avenue is a light rail station on the Canberra Metro R1 Civic to Gungahlin line, located at the intersection of Nullarbor Avenue and Flemington Road. The station was a key location during construction and testing of the light rail route and serves the suburbs of Franklin and Harrison. A crossover track is located immediately north of the platforms, making it possible for light rail vehicles to terminate here, however currently all services continue through the station. The station offers bicycle lockers in addition to  "kiss and ride" bays, installed around the intersection adjacent to the station.

In February 2020, Nullarbor Avenue was the fourth busiest station on the line, after the two termini and Dickson Interchange, with 6% of all customers beginning or ending a journey here in the first 10 months of operation.

Light rail services
All services in both directions stop at the station. Although the station is not a major interchange, transfers to local ACTION bus routes 21 and 22 are also available.

References

Railway stations in Australia opened in 2019
Light rail stations in Canberra